Kevin Quiñones Quintana (born 30 April 1992 in Mexico D.F.) is a Mexican footballer, currently playing as a midfielder for Pumas Morelos of the Liga de Ascenso He studied at Colegi Madrid with Diego de Buen and David Izazola. He currently plays for Sport Club Internacional

References

1992 births
Living people
Mexican footballers
Club Universidad Nacional footballers
Liga MX players
Association football midfielders
Universiade bronze medalists for Mexico
Universiade medalists in football